Platypalpus is a genus of hybotid flies. It is worldwide in distribution, but best represented in Europe, with over 200 species. There are at least 580 described species in Platypalpus worldwide.

See also
 List of Platypalpus species

References

Further reading

External links

 

Hybotidae
Articles containing video clips
Empidoidea genera
Taxa named by Pierre-Justin-Marie Macquart